Rokantiškės Castle ruins are in Naujoji Vilnia elderate of Vilnius, Lithuania.

The castle was located east of Vilnius on a high hill near the Vilnia River. The first castle was built in the 12th century. In the 16th century, it was rebuilt in the Renaissance style and has been the seat of the Olshanski family. Alexander Olshanski, Yuri Olshanski and the last family member Pawel Olshanski have lived there. After his death the castle was inherited by Bona Sforza and later passed to the Pac family. The Deputy Chancellor of Lithuania Stefan Pac was visited here by the King of Poland and Grand duke of Lithuania  Władysław IV Vasa on July 15, 1636.

The castle was burnt down by Cossacks on August 7, 1655 during the Russo-Polish War and fell in ruins. Today there are the only visible medieval castle ruins in Vilnius.

See also
List of castles in Lithuania

References

Former castles in Lithuania
Buildings and structures in Vilnius
Ruins in Lithuania
Naujoji Vilnia
Tourist attractions in Vilnius